Austromacoma is a genus of bivalves belonging to the family Tellinidae.

The species of this genus are found in America, Western Africa and Malesia.

Species:

Austromacoma biota 
Austromacoma birmanica 
Austromacoma constricta 
Austromacoma laevigata 
Austromacoma lucerna 
Austromacoma nymphalis

References

Tellinidae
Bivalve genera